Madelaine "Madel" Yorobe Alfelor-Gazmen is the first who become lady Mayor of Iriga City.

References

1968 births
Living people
Mayors of places in Camarines Sur
Women mayors of places in the Philippines
Independent politicians in the Philippines
University of the Philippines alumni